Thap Than is a district (amphoe) in the northern part of Uthai Thani province, northern Thailand.

History
In a Siamese-Burmese war of Ayutthaya era, the troops of Ayutthaya followed the Burmese troops and overtook them in the area of the district. They fought and the Siamese troops won. The people named the area Ban Thap Than.

In 1906 the district was renamed from Nong Kradi to Thap Than.

In 1917, Thap Than district was added to Uthai Thani Province.

Geography
Neighboring districts are (from the southeast clockwise) Mueang Uthai Thani, Nong Khayang, Nong Chang, Lan Sak, and Sawang Arom of Uthai Thani Province; Krok Phra of Nakhon Sawan province.

Administration
The district is divided into 10 sub-districts (tambons), which are further subdivided into 90 villages (mubans). The sub-district municipality (thesaban tambon), Thap Than, covers tambons Thap Than, Thung Na Thai, Khao Khi Foi, and Nong Ya Plong. The sub-district municipality Taluk Du covers the tambon Taluk Du. There are a further five tambon administrative organizations (TAO).

References

External links
amphoe.com (Thai)
 Thap Than district history(Thai)

Thap Than